Blonde Ambition is a 2007 American romantic comedy film directed by Scott Marshall and starring Jessica Simpson as a small-town girl who moves to New York City and rises up into a career as a business woman. The film also stars Luke Wilson, Rachael Leigh Cook, Penelope Ann Miller, Andy Dick, Drew Fuller, Larry Miller and Willie Nelson.

Before the film started filming, sources reported that Blonde Ambition was a remake of the 1988 film Working Girl. After learning about this rumor, Simpson told Empire in November 2006, "It's definitely the theme of Working Girl – this small town girl moving to New York City and rising up into this great career as a business woman pretty much. But it's definitely not a remake." She also described Blonde Ambition as "more of a knockabout comedy" than Working Girl, which "had one foot in drama".

Plot

Katie Gregerstitch and Billy are high school sweethearts from Minden, Oklahoma who are engaged to be married. An aspiring model he goes to NYC, promising to be back in six months for the wedding. On Valentine's Day, Katie's grandfather gives her a bus ticket to surprise him, but she catches him in bed with another woman. 

Billy breaks off the engagement with Katie, who then goes to stay with her cousin Haley. She convinces Katie to start an independent life of her own, instead of sitting around doing nothing. One day, when Haley has an audition, Katie takes over her job as a messenger. 

When Katie makes a delivery to a large building construction company, the deputy director Debra sees the naive girl and befriends her. She preys on Richard's job as CEO and has come up with a plan to frame him for sabotage to take over the company. To aid herself with that, she and her assistant Freddy make sure that Richard’s secretary gets dismissed and that the naive Katie takes her place. 

Debra takes Katie to give her a makeover. With a more professional appearance, and an embellished resumè, Katie gets hired by Richard Connolley. Katie meanwhile meets Ben, who works as a postman in the building, who befriends her.

An idea of Katie's to get a potential investor, by throwing a kids party for his kid while he sneaks off to do business is sabotaged by Debra and Freddy. They spike their juice with energy drink, slash the bouncy castle, fill the piñata with fireworks and hire male strippers dressed as cops. 

After losing the contract, Katie gets fired, but she uses her charms to get a second chance from Richard. She secures the interest of a group of Norwegian investors with Ben's help, but no thanks to Freddy who tries to sabotage it. 

Richard shares an important confidential marina project with Katie. Not realizing Debra's ulterior motives she manages to get the confidential information out of Katie. That evening Ben shows up at Katie's. After pizza, a dance and a kiss her grandfather gives her a surprise visit. 

The next day at work, Debra ensures the Board of Directors fires Richard, using information from the report she'd weaseled out of Katie the previous day. She also discloses that Katie's resumé is padded (as Freddy had done it).

Returning to the apartment, Katie finds Billy waiting for her. She turns him away, only to have her grandfather reappear with him. As she'd never told him they had broken up, Billy pretty easily gets her to pack up to return to Minden. Just before they leave, her grandfather sets her aside, telling her Haley filled him in on Billy's infidelity, so he takes him back home.

Meanwhile, as Katie has discovered that Ben is actually Richard’s son, together with him they devise a ruse to outsmart Debra. When she proposes the project to the investors, it is actually Haley and some friends who pose as the investors. At the same time, Katie presents her own proposal to the real investors, who satisfyingly take it. When Debra discovers the deception, she flies into a rage, tries to destroy their model of it and thus gets fired.

Afterwards, Katie gets Richard reinstated and when she moves to give Ben a kiss, he deflects it. She leaves unhappy and when Richard asks why he was cold, he mentions her fiancé. Ben races after her and they finally have a second kiss.

Cast
 Jessica Simpson as Katie Gregerstitch
 Luke Wilson as Ben Connelly
 Drew Fuller as Billy
 Rachael Leigh Cook as Haley 
 Paul C. Vogt as Floyd
 Andy Dick as Freddy
 Bill Jenkins as Robert Perry
 Karen McClain as Betty
 Larry Miller as Richard Connelly
 Penelope Ann Miller as Debra
 Piper Mackenzie Harris as Amber Perry
 Sarah Ann Schultz as Samantha
 Dan Braverman as Cab Driver 
 Willie Nelson as Pap Paw
 Casey Keene as Office Assistant
 Ryan Dunn as Griswold

Reception

Box office
Blonde Ambition was released into eight theatres in Texas, the home state for stars Simpson and Wilson, on December 22, 2007, before a DVD release date on January 22, 2008. The film averaged $48 per screen on December 22, 2007, for a total box office of $384, meaning that, based on an $8 ticket price, six people paid to see the film at each of those eight theatres and 48 people in total went to see the film.

Opening weekend, the film finished 54th at the North American box office with a three-day gross of $1,332 and a per-theatre-average of $165.  In Ukraine, the film opened at #1 in its first weekend (February 16–17, 2008), earning $253,008. In Russia, Blonde Ambition opened up at #7 at box office and has grossed $1,010,235 to date, and in the Philippines it opened at #5 and has grossed $16,538 to date.

Blonde Ambition, despite being a box office disappointment, impressively grossed $2.7 million in the first five days of DVD release ranking #23 on the DVD sales chart. This is possibly due to Jessica Simpson's fanbase supporting her. Since the movie's DVD release date it has grossed $11.56 million in the United States.

Critical response

Joe Leydon of Variety gave it a negative review but said that it "sustains a sense of buoyancy" that makes it "relatively painless".

Soundtrack 
 Jessica Simpson - "A Public Affair" (For Trailer Purposes Only)
 KT Tunstall - "Suddenly I See" (For Trailer Purposes Only)
 Lily May - "I Got Love"
 Monique Ximenez - "You Can Fly"
 Austin Brown - "Let's Make Love"
 Hipjoint feat. Stef Lang - "Girl From Nowhere"
 MegaJive - "The Way I Rock"
 Stretch Nickel - "Beautiful Day"
 Price - "Something In Your Eyes"
 Hugh James Hardman - "Live A Little"
 Adam Ant - "Wonderful"

Home media
The DVD was released in the US on January 22, 2008, and has also been released on iTunes. In the United Kingdom and Ireland, the film was released direct to DVD in June 2010.

References

External links 
 
 
 
 DVD Talk discusses Jessica Simpson's performance in Blonde Ambition

2007 films
2000s business films
2007 romantic comedy films
American business films
American romantic comedy films
American screwball comedy films
Films about businesspeople
Films directed by Scott Marshall
Films set in New York City
Films shot in Louisiana
Films shot in New York City
2000s English-language films
2000s American films